Bolair is a small unincorporated community in Webster County, West Virginia, United States, on West Virginia Route 20. To the east is the smaller town of Jerryville. Both towns are about 75 miles east of the state capital, Charleston. The Gauley River runs through the center of the community.

Several traditions explain the origin of the name.

References

Unincorporated communities in Webster County, West Virginia
Unincorporated communities in West Virginia